The Weser-Bahn (Weser railway) is  the name used in the German state of North Rhine-Westphalia (NRW) for a Regionalbahn service that connects Bünde in NRW via Löhne, Rinteln, Hamelin, Elze to Hildesheim. The section of the route from Rinteln to Hildesheim lies in the state of Lower Saxony. The service is numbered as RB 77 in NRW.

Route 

The Weser-Bahn service runs on four different railway lines:
The Weser-Bahn begins in Bünde on the Löhne–Rheine railway and follow it up to its terminus in Löhne;
In Löhne, the Weser-Bahn changes to the Elze–Löhne railway, which it used for its whole length;
From Elze to Nordstemmen the Weser-Bahn runs over the Hanoverian Southern Railway;
The final section of the Weser-Bahn runs to Hildesheim via the Lehrte–Nordstemmen railway.

Rail services 

Until December 2003, the Weser-Bahn was operated by Deutsche Bahn with class 628 DMUs.

In 2002, the tender for the operation of Regionalbahn service RB 77 for eight years was publicly advertised; this was let to Eurobahn, a subsidiary of the Keolis group (Keolis Deutschland GmbH & Co. KG, Berlin), based in Bielefeld.

Since December 2011, the service has been operated by NordWestBahn under a new ten-year contract.

It is operated using two-part Alstom Coradia LINT diesel railcars, which are owned by Landesnahverkehrsgesellschaft Niedersachsen mbH (Lower Saxony state transport company, LNVG). In operations, the trains on the Weser-Bahn service continue through Hildesheim towards the Lamme Valley Railway to Bodenburg.

Fares

The Weser-Bahn runs through several fare zones, some of which overlap. It can be used with the following fares:
between Bünde and Rinteln Der Sechser ("the six") fare of the Verkehrsverbund OstWestfalenLippe (transport association of Ostwestfalen-Lippe) applies;
between Hessisch Oldendorf and Hildesheim and on the Lamme Valley Railway to Bodenburg the fares of the Großraum-Verkehr Hannover (transport association of greater Hannover, GVH) apply (but only for travel cards, trips must include at least one station in the outer ring of the GVH);
for all journeys not included in the transport association zones, Deutsche Bahn fares and the NRW state fare (NRW-Tarif). The Lower Saxony state fare (Niedersachsen-Ticket) is valid on the entire Weser-Bahn between Bünde and Hildesheim.

Adjacent bus fare zones are:
between Hessian Oldendorf and Osterwald (Salzhemmendorf), the Öffi-Tarif of Nahverkehr Hameln-Pyrmont (Hameln-Pyrmont local transport);
between Elze and Hildesheim Hbf the fares of the Regionalverkehr Hildesheim (Hildesheim regional transport, RVHI).

Notes

Rail services in North Rhine-Westphalia